The earliest known Christian texts in Old Uyghur are known from manuscript fragments uncovered in the Turfan oasis.  There are approximately fifty fragments written in Old Uyghur. An early Uyghur translation of the New Testament and the Psalms may have been done in the 14th century by Giovanni da Montecorvino, papal envoy to the Mongols who became Roman Catholic archbishop of Khanbaliq in 1307.

The first modern translation into the Uyghur language—which is a cousin and not a descendant of Old Uyghur—began in the late 19th century, when Johannes Avetaranian, a Turk working with the Swedish Missionary Society, translated the New Testament into Uyghur. The gospels were published in 1898 by the British and Foreign Bible Society in Leipzig. Avetaranian had translated the whole New Testament, but could not get the British and Foreign Bible Society to print it all at once. He left Xinjiang, thinking it would be temporary, but never returned. Avetaranian revised his Gospels, and in 1911, along with Acts they were published by the German Orient Mission, in Plovdiv, Bulgaria. Gustaf Raquette, also with the Swedish Missionary Society, came to Plovdiv, Bulgaria, and worked together with Avetaranian on a revision of the New Testament translation. This revision was published by the British and Foreign Bible Society in 1914.

Selections from the Old Testament, translated by Avetaranian was published in Bulgaria in 1907. It is a small booklet though, and it is unclear how much/if he translated any more than that.

Genesis in 1917, Job in 1921, and Psalms in 1923 were translated by other members of the Swedish Missionary Society, especially Oscar Andersson. The British and Foreign Bible Society also printed a revision of the New Testament, by Lars Erik Hogberg and G. Sauerwein in Cairo, in 1939.

George Hunter, of the China Inland Mission in Urumqi, translated Mark, published in 1920 by the Shanghai branch of the British and Foreign Bible Society, and Acts, published by them in 1922. 1 Samuel (a tentative edition) was published in Urumqi in 1917.

After the Swedes had been exiled from Xinjiang, Gustaf Ahlbert, Oskar Hermannson, Dr. Nur Luke (a Uyghur), Moulvi Munshi, and Moulvi Fazil, completed the translation of the Uyghur Bible in India. This, and a revision of the New Testament, was published by the British and Foreign Bible Society in 1950, in Cairo.

The reformation of the Uyghur Arabic alphabet in the 1930s-1950s rendered the translations done by the Swedish missionaries obsolete. A new Bible translation had to be produced.

The Uyghur Bible Society has published the New Testament and portions of the Old Testament into modern Uyghur. Another translation into modern Uyghur is the "Mukaddes Kalam" translation. DunyaningNuri also produced in 2013 a version of the Cairo Bible revised and updated into modern Uyghur.

Text examples

References

Book of a Thousand Tongues online
The Holy Bible in Eastern (Kashgar) Turki (1950)

External links
Mukaddes Kalam
Uyghur Bible Society
Dunyaning Nuri

Uyghur
Uyghur language
History of Plovdiv